Boyd Calvin Tinsley (born May 16, 1964) is an American violinist and mandolinist who is best known for having been a member of the Dave Matthews Band.

Early life
Tinsley was raised in a musical family. His father was a choir director and his uncle a bassist who also played the trumpet for local bands. 

Tinsley graduated from the University of Virginia. While there, he became a member of the Sigma Nu fraternity.

Career

Dave Matthews Band

In 1991, Dave Matthews asked Tinsley to play violin on the song "Tripping Billies" with his band for their demo tape. Tinsley left his existing band (the Boyd Tinsley Trio) to join Dave Matthews Band. He became a full-time band member in 1992. Matthews later said, "We had no plans of adding a violinist. We just wanted some fiddle tracked on this one song "Tripping Billies", and Boyd was a friend of Leroi. He came in and it just clicked. That completely solidified the band, gave it a lot more power."

After noticeably struggling at shows during 2014 in Australia, Tinsley revealed via his Twitter page that he had developed arthritis in his right hand. Tinsley underwent surgery to correct carpal tunnel syndrome. 

In February 2018, Tinsley took a leave of absence from the band to focus on his health. On May 18, 2018, the band announced that Tinsley had been fired in response to a lawsuit filed by former Crystal Garden band member James Frost-Winn alleging sexual misconduct by Tinsley.

Crystal Garden
In August 2015, Tinsley formed Crystal Garden with Mycle Wastman, Charlie Csontos and Matt Frewen. For two years, he looked for a specific group of musicians who would form a modern day rock band. On the forming of the band, Tinsley commented, "The band was an idea I had maybe three years ago. I really wanted to create a young rock band – not a pop band – but a real rock band that had the same sensibility that rock from the 1960s and 1970s had to it. You know, something rocking from the heart and expressing something real". In their first week of recording sessions at Boyd's studio in Virginia they tracked the bulk of their first studio album, Let The Rocks Cry Out, which Tinsley produced. The album was released digitally on all platforms March 14, 2017 and physically on April 22, 2017. The band appeared on numerous morning shows.

On February 2, 2018, attorneys for former Crystal Garden band member James Frost-Winn sent Tinsley a demand letter in an effort to obtain an out-of-court settlement in regard to sexual harassment allegations. The case was settled in June 2019.

Other work
In 2000, Tinsley made a guest appearance on The Getaway People'''s second album, Turnpike Diaries.

In 2003, Tinsley released a solo album, True Reflections, featuring the title track he had written over a decade earlier. Tinsley was the principal songwriter of the album. True Reflections focuses on Tinsley as a singer-songwriter and does not feature much violin playing.

On March 20, 2009, Tinsley appeared with former U.S. poet laureate Rita Dove at the Paramount Theater in Charlottesville when she launched her poetry book Sonata Mulattica, about 19th-century violin virtuoso George Bridgetower; Tinsley is mentioned in the first poem in the book, "The Bridgetower". He composed and performed a musical piece for the event, read a poem from the book and discussed his musical life in particular and the role of classically trained African-American musicians in general with Dove.

Tinsley was a writer for the short film Faces in the Mirror, which was first shown at the Woodstock Film Festival on October 13, 2012.

Personal life
Tinsley has two children with his wife Emily: a daughter, Abagail (born 1996) and a son, Noah (born 1999).

Tinsley played in a celebrity doubles tennis match in 2007 with John McEnroe against Pete Sampras and Autria Godfrey. He has recorded a song called "The Ghosts of Wimbledon" for the 2006 ESPN coverage of the tournament. Tinsley sponsored the Boyd Tinsley Tennis Program in Charlottesville.

 Discography See Dave Matthews Band discography for his work with the band.Solo discographyTrue Reflections'' (2003) – #3 Billboard Internet Sales chart

References

External links

"Central perk: DMB provides the sound of money" article in which Tinsley talks of the Central Park concert to the Hook weekly
"The boys are back: DMB come home to finish up" interview in the Hook weekly
 Dave Matthews Band Live from The Beacon Theater on Fuse TV June 1, 2009

Dave Matthews Band members
1964 births
Living people
American rock violinists
Musicians from Charlottesville, Virginia
American male violinists
African-American rock musicians
21st-century violinists